Andrei Mironov or Andrey Mironov may refer to:
Andrei Mironov (activist) (1954–2014), political prisoner and activist
Andrei Mironov (actor) (1941–1987), theatre and film actor
Andrei Mironov (footballer, born 1987), Russian football player
Andrei Mironov (footballer, born 1997), Russian football player
Andrei Mironov (ice hockey) (born 1994), ice hockey defenceman
Andrei Mironov (painter) (born 1975), artist